Megachile sikorae is a species of bee in the family Megachilidae. It was described by Friese in 1900.

References

Sikorae
Insects described in 1900